Nainggolan is a surname. Notable people with the surname include:

 Radja Nainggolan (born 1988), Belgian football player
 Rustam Effendy Nainggolan (born 1950), Indonesian politician

Surnames of Indonesian origin
Indonesian-language surnames